Myint Naing, (born 26 February 1967) is a Myanmar watercolour artist. Myint Naing was born in Gwa village, Rakhine State, Myanmar. He graduated from the State School of Fine Arts (Yangon)(1986–1989). He studied under U Kyaw Lay,  U Mya Aye, U Say Yoe, U Thit Lwin Soe and U Thukha.

Exhibitions

External links
 Myint Naing Trish gallery

References

Burmese painters
1967 births
Living people
People from Rakhine State